Chrysolina sanguinolenta is a species of leaf beetle native to Europe.

References

External links
Images representing Chysolina at BOLD

Chrysomelinae
Beetles described in 1758
Beetles of Europe
Taxa named by Carl Linnaeus